The commune of Mugamba is a commune of Bururi Province in south-western Burundi. The capital lies at Mugamba.

References

Communes of Burundi
Bururi Province